Ngongotahā is a town on the western shores of Lake Rotorua in New Zealand's North Island. It is 10 kilometers northwest of Rotorua city, and is part of the Rotorua metropolitan area.

Its name is derived from a legend of Ihenga, the famous Māori explorer. It is said Īhenga met the Patu-paiarehe on Mount Ngongotahā and was offered a drink from a calabash. Ngongo means "to drink", and tahā means "calabash". Ngongotahā is often referred to by locals as the "Sunny side of the Mountain".

Demographics

Ngongotahā had a population of 4,872 at the 2018 New Zealand census, an increase of 618 people (14.5%) since the 2013 census, and an increase of 810 people (19.9%) since the 2006 census. There were 1,773 households, comprising 2,388 males and 2,478 females, giving a sex ratio of 0.96 males per female, with 1,023 people (21.0%) aged under 15 years, 867 (17.8%) aged 15 to 29, 2,088 (42.9%) aged 30 to 64, and 888 (18.2%) aged 65 or older.

Ethnicities were 68.2% European/Pākehā, 41.9% Māori, 5.5% Pacific peoples, 4.2% Asian, and 1.6% other ethnicities. People may identify with more than one ethnicity.

The percentage of people born overseas was 14.3, compared with 27.1% nationally.

Although some people chose not to answer the census's question about religious affiliation, 52.2% had no religion, 34.9% were Christian, 3.1% had Māori religious beliefs, 0.4% were Hindu, 0.2% were Muslim, 0.2% were Buddhist and 1.2% had other religions.

Of those at least 15 years old, 618 (16.1%) people had a bachelor's or higher degree, and 804 (20.9%) people had no formal qualifications. 414 people (10.8%) earned over $70,000 compared to 17.2% nationally. The employment status of those at least 15 was that 1,812 (47.1%) people were employed full-time, 576 (15.0%) were part-time, and 168 (4.4%) were unemployed.

Marae
Ngongotahā has six marae.

Te Awawherowhero Marae is affiliated with the Ngāti Whakaue hapū of Ngāti Rautao.

Parawai Marae and its Whatumairangi meeting house are affiliated with the Ngāti Whakaue hapū of Ngāti Tuteaiti and Te Whatumairangi, and Te Ure o Uenukukōpako hapū of Ngāti Te Ngākau and Ngāti Tura.

Tarimano Marae and Tawakeheimoa meeting house are affiliated with the Ngāti Rangiwewehi hapū of Ngāti Rangiwewehi ki Uta. In October 2020, the Government committed $4,525,104 from the Provincial Growth Fund to upgrade the marae and nine others, creating an estimated 34 jobs.

Tārukenga Marae and Te Ngākau meeting house are affiliated with the Ngāti Whakaue hapū of Ngāti Te Ngakau and Ngāti Tura, and Te Ure o Uenukukōpako's hapū of Ngāti Te Ngākau and Ngāti Tura.

Waikuta Marae and its Rangitunaeke meeting house are affiliated with the Ngāti Whakaue hapū of Ngāti Rangitunaeke.

Waitetī or Weriweri Marae and its Ngāraranui meeting house are affiliated with the Ngāti Whakaue hapū of Ngāti Ngāraranui, and Te Ure o Uenukukōpako hapū of Ngāti Ngāraranui. In October 2020, the Government committed $372,420 from the Provincial Growth Fund to upgrade the marae, and create 20 jobs.

Mount Ngongotahā
It towers above the city; and hosts a Gondola to the top where there is a viewing platform, luge and restaurant.

The Mount Ngongotahā Jubilee Track provides the only walking track to the summit, and passes through a scenic reserve. The first section of the track is through original native forest that has not been logged. The original track was cut on Jubilee Day, marking 50 years since the arrival of Captain William Hobson at Waitangi.

Another visitor attraction on the slopes of Mount Ngongotahā is the Wingspan National Bird of Prey Centre.  It is a captive breeding facility and visitor centre located in the Ngongotahā Valley. Wingspan undertakes conservation, education and research activities related to birds of prey found in New Zealand, and provides demonstrations of falconry.

Sports
The village has strong football (Ngongotaha AFC), rugby league (Ngongotaha Sports & Community Association), rugby union, netball and touch teams.

Transport
The main road through the village, known as SH 36, runs via Kaharoa and Pyes Pa to Tauranga.

The Rotorua Branch railway runs through Ngongotahā, although this has been unused since the turn of the century. A railway park, operated by a trust and run by volunteers, provides train rides on a scale model steam train and a mini diesel-locomotive on the western side of Ngongotahā near the former line.

Fishing 
The Ngongotahā Stream, which flows through the village centre and onward into Lake Rotorua is  one of the most heavily fished areas in New Zealand. Specimen rainbow trout and brown trout are regularly taken by fly fishermen. Other nearby streams (Awahou, Waiteti and Hamurana) also offer good fishing.

Education

Notable people 

Despite its small size, Ngongotahā has produced a number of famous New Zealanders, including:

Temuera Morrison, actor
Phillip Orchard, New Zealand international rugby league player (1960s–1970s)
Robert Orchard, New Zealand international rugby league player (1960s–1970s)
Jeremy Paul, Australian international rugby player, a 1999 World Cup winner
Hika Reid, New Zealand international rugby union player 1980–1986
Ron Russell, Canadian politician

References 

Populated places in the Bay of Plenty Region
Populated places on Lake Rotorua
Volcanoes of the Bay of Plenty Region
Rotorua Volcanic Centre